Ursula Wikström (born 3 July 1980) is a Finnish professional golfer who plays on the Ladies European Tour. She represented Finland at the 2016 Rio Olympics and won the 2017 Ladies Finnish Open.

Career
Wikström played college golf with the New Mexico State Aggies and won six college tournaments. She married Mika Wikström, who works for the Finnish Golf Federation, in early 2005 and changed her name from Tuutti to Wikström.

Wikström joined the Ladies European Tour in 2004 and has multiple runner-up finishes. In 2008, she finished second at the Finnair Masters behind compatriot Minea Blomqvist. She was also runner-up at the 2009 Open de France Dames, 2012 Turkish Airlines Ladies Open as well as the 2012 and 2015 Dutch Ladies Open. 

In 2019 she had a consistent year with eight top-20 finishes, including a season-best result of fourth in the Estrella Damm Mediterranean Ladies Open, and finished 17th on the Order of Merit.

She won the Ladies Finnish Open, a LET Access Series event, in 2017 and was runner-up in 2018 and 2019.

Wikström qualified for the 2016 Summer Olympics where she finished in a tie for 44th.

Professional wins

LET Access Series
2017 EVLI Ladies Finnish Open

Team appearances
Amateur
European Ladies' Team Championship (representing Finland): 1999, 2001, 2003

Professional
European Championships (representing Finland): 2018

References

External links

Finnish female golfers
New Mexico State Aggies women's golfers
Ladies European Tour golfers
Olympic golfers of Finland
Golfers at the 2016 Summer Olympics
Sportspeople from Espoo
1980 births
Living people